Sabyn Mayfield (born June 16, 1981) is a multi hyphenate American filmmaker, actor, and musician.

Early life 

Mayfield was born June 16, 1981, in Nashville, Tennessee. He is the son of casting director, Laray Mayfield, and musician, Randy Parton. He is the nephew of Dolly Parton and Stella Parton. After attending Malibu High School, Sabyn graduated from the prestigious Los Angeles Film School in 2001 with a major in Directing and a minor in Producing.

Career

Early career (2001 - 2009) 
Sabyn Mayfield worked for various commercial production companies in Los Angeles as a production assistant. In 2004, he was hired to work on the Donal Logue film Tennis Anyone, and made the transition to gripping. Mayfield worked on films including WristCutter, Conversations with Other Women, and Unknown.  He joined the Local 80 Grip Union in 2006. Sabyn continued to work as a grip on films through 2009.

Casting (2009 - 2012) 
Exposed to the casting industry at a young age, Mayfield worked alongside his mother, Laray Mayfield, beginning with commercials in 2009, then expanding into film & television. His casting resume includes commercials for Nike, GAP, Coke, Lexus, BMW, and Footlocker. He worked with directors David Fincher, Mark Romanek, Justin Timberlake, Jean Baptiste Mondino, Harmony Korine, Joseph Kosinski, Craig Brewer, and others.

Directing, Writing, Producing 
While in Film School, Sabyn developed a cache of work which featured Tears, a narrative short starring Michael Madsen based on his poem of the same name, as published in the book, Burning in Paradise. In 2012, after many year of climbing the proverbial industry ladder, Mayfield refocused his attention on directing, producing, and writing. Sabyn has directed music video for artists including: himself, Redlight King, Julien Baker, Vanessa Carlton, Shannon Magrane, Olivia Lane, and Space Capone. His commercial work includes spots for local and national brands, but is highlighted by a series of anti-bullying PSA's provided to organizations against bullying around the globe to raise awareness.

Sabyn's feature film debut was Boomtown, starring Tyler Riggs, Rachel Brosnahan, Boyd Holbrook, Dwight Yoakam, and Jocelin Donahue. Filmed in Williston, North Dakota, it features original music by John Moreland. His follow up movie, Time Cant Be Wasted was released in 2020.

Filmography

Awards

Music 
In 2004, Sabyn entered the music industry, and was booked for his first gig by Sean Healy Presents at The Knitting Factory. He has played many of the iconic venues in Los Angeles, including The Key Club, House of Blues, Whiskey, The Roxy, and the El Rey Theatre. He opened for artists including Afrika Bambaataa, Nappy Roots, Necro, Mistah F.A.B, Zion I and The Grouch, and Young Dre the Truth.

His first official release, It’s a Long Dark Road, was a country / hip-hop hybrid recorded in collaboration with Mike Baiardi of Soundfile Productions. The song was submitted for consideration as the title track for the FX series Justified. Approached by the music supervisors of the MTV show Buckwild, Sabyn and Mike recorded a full-length record, Trailer Park VIP, for the show under the stage name The Redneckz. After the show was cancelled, due to the death of a cast member, the album was picked up for the CMT show Party Down South. A second record, Barn Burner, was also used for the show.

In 2020, in the midst of pandemic,  Sabyn recorded the Halfway There EP featuring three songs, 9 to 5 to 9 ( a re-mix of Dolly Parton’s iconic 9 to 5), Oh Tennessee (as a tribute to and a re-mix of Tennessee Born, originally recorded by Randy Parton), and a collaboration with Johnny Berry and The Outliers, Halfway to Louisville. During the recording process, he signed with Gil Holland and sonaBLAST! Records. Since the release of his debut EP, Sabyn has continued to record and release music at a fevered pitch.

In 2021, Mayfield established CashVillian Music as a publishing company under BMI.

Discography 
Devil May Care Boy (2022)

The Ville Mixtape, Vol. 1 (2022)

Palm Trees & Street Dreams (2022)

Electronic Sketchpad, Volume 2 (2022)

Electronic Sketchpad, Volume 1 (2022)

Crossroads (2021)

Urban Cowboy (2021)

Halfway There (2021)

It's a Long Dark Road (2010)

Barn Burner (Redneckz)

Trailer Park VIP (Redneckz)

Stay Fly, LLC 
Stay Fly, LLC was established in 2012 by Mayfield, as a creative hub to produce his music, film, and other creative projects; while lending knowledge and support to other filmmakers looking to do the same. Coined after the Three 6 Mafia song, Stay Fly, the company name is an ode to his Tennessee roots.

Personal 
A lifelong athlete, Sabyn was a highly-recruited football player while at Malibu High School. Mayfield was also a member of the basketball, baseball, and track teams while at Malibu High. Mayfield developed a love for combat sports after being exposed to kickboxing by his best friend in high school. He is an amateur boxer competing through USA Boxing and has participated in multiple fights. Sabyn struggled with substance abuse in early adulthood, and today, counsels’ others working towards recovery from substance abuse and mental health issues.  He earned his RADT and CADC certificates in 2022 and is a member of CCAPP. Mayfield currently resides in Los Angeles with his son.

References

External links
 Sabyn Mayfield – Filmography
 

American film directors
American film producers
1981 births
Living people